Hendek (Laz language: Gvarci) is a village in the Hopa District, Artvin Province, Turkey. Its population is 245 (2021).

References

Villages in Hopa District